Murray Frank LLP (formerly known as Murray, Frank & Sailer LLP) is a law firm based in New York City that specializes in class action litigation, particularly in cases involving federal securities law, federal antitrust law, ERISA, and state consumer protection law.

Notable cases
The firm traces its origin to 1963, and has litigated the landmark cases of Sirota v. Solitron Devices, Inc. (holding that there is an implied right of contribution among joint tortfeasors)  and Escott v. BarChris Const. Corp. (holding that a commencement of a class action tolls the statute of limitations for claims of other class members).

Brian Murray, a current partner at the firm, prevailed on an issue of first impression in the Superior Court of Massachusetts, in Cambridge Biotech Corp. v. Deloitte and Touche LLP, in which the court applied the doctrine of continuous representation for statute of limitations purposes to accountants for the first time in Massachusetts.

Jacqueline Sailer, a former partner at the firm, prevailed in Naevus Intl., Inc. v. AT&T Corp.,  in which the court established limits on the reach of the Federal Communications Act on state consumer fraud claims, and Kinney v. Metro Global Media, Inc.,  in which the court addressed the pleading standard for fraud under the Private Securities Litigation Reform Act of 1995 for claims against an auditor, an issue of first impression in the District of Rhode Island.

Notable settlements
 Merrill Lynch Research Reports Securities Litigation:  Murray, Frank & Sailer was court appointed co-lead counsel.  Plaintiffs alleged that Merrill Lynch, through its analyst Henry Blodget, issued falsely positive analyst reports that Blodget himself did not believe, in an effort to obtain investment banking business.  Merrill Lynch was ultimately investigated by the New York State Attorney General and paid a $100 million fine  for this conduct, while Blodget was barred from the securities industry by the Securities Exchange Commission and paid $4 million in fines and disgorgement.   In 2007, this litigation was settled, resulting in an additional $125 million recovery for shareholders.
 General Motors Corporation Securities and Derivative Litigation:  Murray, Frank & Sailer served as initial lead counsel.  Plaintiffs alleged that from 2000-2006, General Motors and its auditor Deloitte & Touche LLP issued financial statements that misstated and mischaracterized GM's revenue, earnings, and cash flow, which artificially inflated the price of various GM securities.  In 2008, this litigation was settled, resulting in a $303 million recovery for GM shareholders.
 In re Williams Securities Litigation:  Murray, Frank & Sailer served as additional Plaintiffs' counsel.  Plaintiffs alleged that between 2000 and 2002, the Williams Companies made various false and misleading statements that inflated prices of various Williams securities.  In 2007, this litigation was settled, resulting in a $311 million recovery for Williams shareholders.   Murray, Frank & Sailer represented a client who had purchased Feline PAC preferred securities worth $125; the firm obtained a $10 million recovery for the subclass of that security's purchasers.
 In re Royal Ahold Securities Litigation:  Murray, Frank & Sailer served as additional Plaintiffs' counsel.  Plaintiffs alleged that Ahold issued various false and misleading statements between 1999 and 2003, and was ultimately forced to announce billions of dollars in restatements of revenue and earnings in connection with its operations around the world.  In 2006, the litigation was settled, resulting in a $1.1 billion recovery for Ahold shareholders.

Notable alumni
 Maurice Pesso is a partner at White & Williams LLP.
 Paul Curley is a partner at Kaufman Borgeest & Ryan LLP
 Eric Belfi is a partner at Labaton Sucharow
 Sharon Lee is a partner at Lieff Cabraser

Attorney publications
 Benjamin Bianco, Recent Developments in Class Arbitration, MEALEY'S LITIGATION REPORT, Sept. 17, 2009.
 Brian P Murray, Lifting the PSLRA "Automatic Stay" of Discovery, N. DAK. L. REV. 405 (2004).
 Brian P Murray, Aftermarket Purchaser Standing Under Section 11 of the Securities Act of 1933, 73 ST. JOHN'S L. REV. 633 (1999).
 Brian P Murray, Recent Rulings Allow Section 11 Suits By Aftermarket Securities Purchasers, NEW YORK LAW JOURNAL (Sept. 24, 1998).
 Brian P. Murray and Eric J. Belfi, The Proportionate Trading Model: Real Science or Junk Science?, 52 CLEVELAND ST. L. REV. 391 (2004–05).
 Brian P. Murray and Leo W. Desmond, Determining Excessive Trading in Option Accounts: A Synthetic Valuation Approach, 23 U. DAYTON L. REV. 316 (1997).
 Brian P. Murray and Joseph P. Garland, Subject Matter Jurisdiction Under the Federal Securities Laws: The State of Affairs After Itoba, 20 MARYLAND JOURNAL OF INT'L LAW AND TRADE 235 (1996).
 Brian P. Murray and Sharon Lee, The PSLRA "Automatic Stay" of Discovery, NEW YORK LAW JOURNAL (March 3, 2003).
 Brian P. Murray and Gregory B. Linkh, Inherent Risk In Securities Cases In The Second Circuit, NEW YORK LAW JOURNAL, Aug. 26, 2004.
 Brian P. Murray and Maurice Pesso, The Accident of Efficiency: Foreign Exchanges, American Depository Receipts, and Space Arbitrage, 51 BUFFALO L. REV. 383 (2003).
 Brian P. Murray and Joseph C. Rosa, He Lies, You Die: Criminal Trials, Truth, Perjury, and Fairness, 27 NEW ENGLAND JOURNAL ON CRIMINAL AND CIVIL CONFINEMENT 1 (2001).
 Brian P. Murray and Jacqueline Sailer, Loss Causation Pleading Standard, NEW YORK LAW JOURNAL (Feb. 25, 2005).
 Brian P. Murray and Donald J. Wallace, You Shouldn't Be Required To Plead More Than You Have To Prove, 53 BAYLOR L. REV. 783 (2001).
 Gregory Frank, Preclusive Effect Of The Federal Securities Laws On Actions Brought Pursuant To Antitrust Laws, NEW YORK LAW JOURNAL (January 7, 2010).
 Marvin L Frank and Brian D. Brooks, Securities Class Actions: Improving Corporate Governance Through Accountability, INTERNATIONAL BAR ASSOCIATION SECURITIES LAW COMMITTEE NEWSLETTER, Aug. 2010.
 Marvin L. Frank and Gregory B. Linkh, Staying Derivative Actions Pursuant to PSLRA and SLUSA, NEW YORK LAW JOURNAL, P. 4, Col. 4, Oct. 21, 2005, and SECURITIES REFORM ACT LITIGATION REPORTER, Vol. 20, No. 3, Dec. 2005.

References

External links 
 Firm Website:  http://www.murrayfrank.com/

Law firms based in New York City